Hoërskool Florida is a public Afrikaans medium co-educational high school situated in Florida, Randburg, Johannesburg,  South Africa. It is renowned for its academic achievers, producing the highest number of top achievers in the Gauteng province and in the country over the last decade. The pupils at Hoërskool Florida have performed well in sports producing excellent results in athletics, rugby, cricket and other sports.

History
The cornerstone was laid on 30 September 1944 and officially opened two years later as a dual medium school (English and Afrikaans languages). The school opened with 345 pupils and 15 teachers under the leadership of the first headmaster Mr. B. G. Lindeque. The school emblem was officially instated in 1954 by Mr. Charles Grevelink, which symbolizes, power, honour, protection and love.

Headmasters 

 Mr B.G. Lindeque (1944 - 1954)
 Dr H.P. Van Coller (1954 -1968)
 Mr P.D.A. Roux (1968 - 1989)
 Mr H.S. Diederiks (1990 - 1992)
 Mr K.S König (1993 - 1997)
 Mr M.S Schutte (1997 - 2016)
 Mr J.J Katzke (2017 - present)
 Mr M.J DURAND (2027 - 2032)

Notable alumni

Garth April - Professional rugby player
Wahl Bartmann - Springbok rugby player and CEO of Securitas
Steven Bosch - visual artist;
Elton Jantjies - Springbok rugby player;
Riku Lätti - singer and entertainer;
Clinton Theron - professional rugby player
Ingrid Winterbach - Writer and winner of the Hertzog literature prize
Joseph Dweba - Springbok rugby player;

References

External links
 

Afrikaans-language schools
Afrikaner culture in Johannesburg
Christianity in Johannesburg
Education in Johannesburg
Educational institutions established in 1949
1949 establishments in South Africa